Coopertown is a small unincorporated community in Miami-Dade County, Florida,  United States. Coopertown is most notable for housing Coopertown Airboat Rides, a tourist attraction founded in 1945.

Geography

References

Unincorporated communities in Miami-Dade County, Florida
Unincorporated communities in Florida